The Mistborn Adventure Game is a pen-and-paper role-playing game published in 2011 by Crafty Games. It is a licensed release based on American author Brandon Sanderson's Mistborn novel series. Sanderson was involved in the game's creation. The game's setting, Scadrial, is the same as that of the Mistborn series. The initial Mistborn Adventure Game book was released on December 16, 2011. Since 2011, four supplementary material books have been published. The first supplement was released March 2014 and is called Terris: Wrought of Copper. The second supplement was released on August 7, 2014 and is called Alloy of Law, not to be confused with the fourth Mistborn book called The Alloy of Law. The third supplement was released on December 22, 2015 and is called Skaa: Tin & Ash. The fourth supplement is called The Alloy of Law: Masks of the Past and was released on August 8, 2017.

Gameplay
The gameplay is largely built on narrative-based roleplay; however, active gameplay is based on rolling dice from a pool of 2–10 six-sided dice. The number of dice rolled is determined by a character's abilities. Conflict is resolved in a similar dice-rolling fashion.

Character creation
Individual characters can be from the various social classes, such as Noble or Skaa, that exist in Scadrial. Although characters must conform to the setting to an extent, the backgrounds and personality of characters are largely created by the player's imagination with little constraint. Each character has different Attributes, Standings, Traits, and Powers that influence the active gameplay.

Published materials
All materials have been created and published by Crafty Games. In addition, all supplementary works include the title of the game itself which is also the name of the first book. The actual title of each supplement is printed beneath the game title.

Reception
Shannon Appelcline commented that, while the gameplay of the Mistborn Adventure Game is "a big departure for Crafty", the game was "well-received and seems to have gotten more retail notice than most of Crafty's other releases to date, likely due to its strong license."

External links
Product page on Crafty Games' website
Brandon Sanderson's website

References

Fantasy role-playing games
Mistborn series
Role-playing games introduced in 2011